The 18 kilometre cross-country skiing event was part of the cross-country skiing at the 1936 Winter Olympics programme. It was the fourth appearance of the event. The competition was held on Wednesday, 12 February 1936. Seventy-five cross-country skiers from 22 nations competed.

Medalists

Results

References

External links
Official Olympic Report
 

Men's 18 kilometre
Men's 18 kilometre cross-country skiing at the Winter Olympics